Statistics of Latvian Higher League in the 1955 season.

Overview
It was contested by 10 teams, and Darba Rezerves won the championship.

League standings

References
RSSSF

Latvian SSR Higher League
Football 
Latvia